Community Service is a continuous mix album released by The Crystal Method.  It features remixes of Crystal Method songs, remixes created by The Crystal Method, and songs from other artists.  Remixed songs from popular bands Garbage, P.O.D., and Rage Against the Machine make appearances and the final track contains voice samples from The Matrix.  A follow up album, Community Service II, was released with a subsequent tour in 2005.

Track listing
 ILS - No Soul (PMT Remix) – 4:17
 Evil Nine - Cake Hole – 5:50
 Stir Fry - Breakin on the Streets (False Prophet Remix) – 3:54
 Koma + Bones - Morpheus (Meat Katie and Dylan Rhymes Mix) – 3:41
 Orbital - Funny Break (One Is Enough) (Plump DJ's Mix) – 5:20
 Elite Force - Curveball – 4:00
 Dastrix - Dude in the Moon (Luna Mix) – 6:04
 The Crystal Method - Name of the Game (Hybrid's LA Blackout Remix) – 5:49
 P.O.D. - Boom (The Crystal Method Remix) – 3:31
 Ceasefire - Trickshot – 3:16
 Rage Against the Machine - Renegades of Funk (The Crystal Method Remix) – 3:55
 Garbage - Paranoid (The Crystal Method Remix) – 5:23
 The Crystal Method - Wild, Sweet and Cool (Static Revenger Mix) – 4:24
 Force Mass Motion vs. Dylan Rhymes - Hold Back – 4:37
 The Crystal Method - You Know It's Hard (Koma + Bones Remix) – 6:40
 Scratch-D vs. H-Bomb - The Red Pill – 3:24

Personnel 

Jeff Aguila – Artwork
Tom Beaufoy – Producer
Howard Benson – Producer
Billy Brunner – Producer, Remixing
Ceasefire – Arranger, Producer
Scott Christina – Producer
Michael Clark – Producer, Mixing
The Crystal Method – Producer, Remixing
Jake Devere – Production Assistant
DJ Swamp – Scratching
Andy Duckmanton – Producer
Elite Force – Producer
Douglas Grean – Guitar
Jim Kissling – Engineer
Mike Koglin – Producer, Mixing
Koma & Bones – Producer, Remixing
Chris Lord-Alge – Mixing
Meat Katie – Producer, Remixing
Tom Morello – Guitar
David B. Noller – Producer
Rage Against the Machine – Producer
Dylan Rhymes – Producer, Remixing
Rick Rubin – Producer
Static Revenger – Producer, Remixing
Ralf Strathmann – Photography
Scott Weiland – Vocals

In popular culture
The remix of P.O.D.'s "Boom" was used in the 2003 video game Amplitude at the request of fans, and was also used in a trailer for the movie Crank: High Voltage.

References

2002 albums
Community Service|Community Service